Voli me, voli (Love Me, Love Me) is the fifth studio album by Yugoslav pop-folk singer Lepa Brena and her band Slatki Greh. It was released 19 March 1986 through the record label PGP-RTB.

This was her sixth of twelve albums with Slatki Greh.

The album was sold in a circulation of 650,000 copies.

Track listing

Personnel

Production and recording
Mića Đordević – supervisor
Dragan Vukićević – engineering
Stanko Terzić – editing

Crew
Ivan Ćulum – design
Ivan Mojašević – photography

References

1986 albums
Lepa Brena albums
PGP-RTB albums
Serbo-Croatian language albums